Robert Paul Bohlinger (born June 14, 1975) is a former American football tackle. He played for the Carolina Panthers in 1998.

References

1975 births
Living people
American football offensive tackles
Wyoming Cowboys football players
Carolina Panthers players
Frankfurt Galaxy players
Players of American football from Minneapolis
People from Fridley, Minnesota